Trowel is an academic journal published by postgraduate students at the School of Archaeology, University College Dublin, Ireland.

It was first published in 1988. The journal was redesigned and relaunched for Volume X 2005 after a five-year hiatus in publication. This involved a change from an A4 black and white format to an A5 full colour volume. New sections added included a 'reflections' section, featuring contributions from prominent members of Irish society on their experiences of archaeology, and a book reviews section.

Volume XI included contributions from post-graduate students from NUI Galway and University College Cork making Trowel one of only four national academic journals in Ireland focusing on the publication of articles relating to archaeology. Others include the Journal of Irish Archaeology (published by the Institute of Archaeologists of Ireland), the Journal of the Royal Society of Antiquaries of Ireland, and Section C of the Proceedings of the Royal Irish Academy.

External links
 
 List of volumes, some downloadable

Archaeology of Ireland
Archaeology journals
University College Dublin
Publications established in 1988
Academic journals edited by students